The Vitaceae are a family of flowering plants, with 14 genera and around 910 known species, including common plants such as grapevines (Vitis spp.) and Virginia creeper (Parthenocissus quinquefolia). The family name is derived from the genus Vitis.

Most Vitis species have 38 chromosomes (n=19), but 40 (n=20) in subgenus Muscadinia, while Ampelocissus, Parthenocissus, and Ampelopsis also have 40 chromosomes (n=20) and Cissus has 24 chromosomes (n=12).

The family is economically important as the berries of Vitis species, commonly known as grapes, are an important fruit crop and, when fermented, produce wine.

Species of the genus Tetrastigma serve as hosts to parasitic plants in the family Rafflesiaceae.

Taxonomy
The name sometimes appears as Vitidaceae, but Vitaceae is a conserved name and therefore has priority over both Vitidaceae and another name sometimes found in the older literature, Ampelidaceae. In the APG III system (2009) onwards, the family is placed in its own order, Vitales. Molecular phylogenetic studies place the Vitales as the most basal clade in the rosids. In the Cronquist system, the family was placed near the family Rhamnaceae in order Rhamnales.

Plants of the World Online currently includes the following genera, placed in two subfamilies:

Leeoideae
 Leea D.Royen: previously placed in its own monotypic family, Leeaceae, was included in Vitaceae by APG IV (2016) and the Angiosperm Phylogeny Website.

Vitoideae
Five tribes are now recognised in this subfamily:
Ampelopsideae

 Ampelopsis A.Rich. ex Michx. (pepper-vines)
 Clematicissus Planch.
 Nekemias Raf.
 Rhoicissus Planch.
Cayratieae

 Acareosperma Gagnep.
 Causonis Raf.
 Cayratia Juss.
 Cyphostemma (Planch.) Alston
 Pseudocayratia J.Wen, L.M.Lu & Z.D.Chen
 Tetrastigma (Miq.) Planch.
Cisseae

 Cissus L. (treebinds) - widespread in  tropics & subtropics
Parthenocisseae

 Parthenocissus Planch.
 Yua C.L.Li
Viteae
 Ampelocissus Planch.
 Vitis L. (includes grape vine)
tribe incertae sedis
 Pterisanthes Blume (Indochina, Malesia)

Earliest fossil history
Well preserved-fruits of Indovitis chitaleyae containing seeds with similar morphology to the Vitaceae have been recovered from Late Cretaceous Deccan Intertrappean beds of several sites in central India. These fruits and their dispersed seeds found in the same sediments, about 66 million years old, represent the oldest known fossils of the grape family. The fossil fruits containing 4 to 6 seeds are very similar to extant Vitis.

References

Vitaceae at the Angiosperm Phylogeny Web
 Vitidaceae in L. Watson and M.J. Dallwitz (1992 onwards). The families of flowering plants: descriptions, illustrations, identification, information retrieval. http://delta-intkey.com

 
Rosid families